Robsahm is a surname. It may refer to:

Fred Robsahm (1943-2015), Norwegian film actor
Margarete Robsahm (born 1942), Norwegian model, actress and director
Maria Robsahm, earlier Maria Carlshamre, (born 1957), Swedish politician and Member of the European Parliament from 2004 to 2009
Thomas Robsahm (born 1964), Norwegian actor, film director and producer